Pablo Ruiz may refer to:
 Pablo Ruiz (singer) (born 1975)
 Pablo Ruiz (album), a 1985 album by Pablo Ruiz
 Pablo Ruiz (footballer, born 1981), Spanish footballer
 Pablo Ruiz (footballer, born 1987), Argentine footballer
 Pablo Ruiz (footballer, born 1998), Argentine footballer
 Pablo Ruiz Picasso (also known simply as Pablo Picasso), Spanish painter

Ruiz, Pablo